Brigadier General Francis Takirwa, is a Ugandan military officer who, effective December 2019, is the commanding officer of the Second Division of the Uganda People's Defence Forces, based in the city of Mbarara in the Western Region of Uganda.

Background and education
He was born in Mbarara District on 7 November 1965. He attended Mbarara Junior School for his primary education. He then studied at Mbarara High School for is O-Level studies. He joined the Uganda Military soon thereafter.

In 1994, he attended a Junior Command and Staff Course at the Uganda Junior Staff College, in Jinja. He then went on to attend a Company Commanders Course at the Tanzania Military Academy at Monduli, in 1998. Later in 2006, he attended an Army Senior Command Course at Nanjig Army Command College, in Nanjing, China. In 2009, he obtained a Diploma in African Strategic Studies from the Nasser Higher Military Academy, in Giza, Egypt. He then attended an Executive National Security Programme at the South African National Defence College.

Career
His service in the Ugandan military date back to 1989. He has served in different leadership roles in the military, including a tour in Somalia, as part of the UPDF contingent to AMISOM, from 2011 until 2012. Immediately prior to his present position, Takirwa was the chief of Education, Sports and Culture in the UPDF. As commander of the 2nd UPDF Division, he replaced Brigadier Kayanja Muhanga who proceeded for further studies at the South African National Defence College.

Other considerations
Brigadier Francis Takirwa is also an army representative in the 10th Parliament (2016 - 2021).

See also
 Muhoozi Kainerugaba

References

External links
 Website of the Parliament of Uganda

Living people
Ugandan military personnel
Members of the Parliament of Uganda
People from Mbarara District
People from Western Region, Uganda
People educated at Mbarara High School
1965 births
21st-century Ugandan politicians